is a global engineering company  specialized in oil and gas midstream for gas processing and LNG, downstream refinery and petrochemicals facilities design and construction. Chiyoda is headquartered in Yokohoma, Japan with engineering offices abroad.  The majority of Chiyoda's business takes place outside Japan, including  the United States, Canada, Latin America, Middle East, African countries, Russia, FSU, South East Asia and Australia.

History
Chiyoda was established as part of Mitsubishi Oil in 1948, and was spun off from its parent and went public in 1957.

In the late 1960s it built the Jeddah and Riyadh refineries in Saudi Arabia; at present its large projects include LNG plants in Qatar, the Sakhalin-II project in eastern Russia, and a variety of specialist-chemical and pharmaceutical plants in Japan itself.

It was, in 2005, the first engineering company in the world to be included in the FTSE4Good index of companies with exemplary corporate social responsibility.

Industries
In pursuit of “Energy and Environment in Harmony”, Chiyoda is an integrated engineering enterprise. Since its establishment in 1948, Chiyoda's business field has covered energy such as oil and gas industry and chemicals, environment, energy conservation, industrial facilities and life science.

Chiyoda now engages in numerous Engineering, Procurement and Construction (EPC) and other type of projects around the world.

For the past several years, Chiyoda has been very active in EPC projects in Americas with its wholly owned subsidiary Chiyoda International Corporation headquartered in Houston, TX.

References

External links 

 
 Wiki collection of company history books on Chiyoda Corporation.

Engineering companies of Japan
Construction and civil engineering companies of Japan
Companies based in Yokohama
Companies listed on the Tokyo Stock Exchange
Construction and civil engineering companies established in 1948
Japanese companies established in 1948
Japanese brands